Saintfield United Football Club is a Northern Irish intermediate football club based in Saintfield, County Down, Northern Ireland playing in Division 1C of the Northern Amateur Football League. The club started in the Newcastle & District League before joining the Amateur League junior section in 1986. Intermediate status was attained in 1987.

Honours

Intermediate honours 
 
 Division 1A Winners: 1
 1991

Squad

Notes

External links
 nifootball.co.uk - (For fixtures, results and tables of all Northern Ireland amateur football leagues)

Association football clubs in Northern Ireland
Association football clubs in County Down
Northern Amateur Football League clubs
1982 establishments in Northern Ireland